Committee on Panchayati Raj Institutions of Punjab Legislative Assembly is constituted annually for a one year period from among the members of the Assembly. This Committee consists of thirteen members.

Overview
According to the Punjab Government Gazette, 2021 the functions of the committee are defined below.

Appointment 
The speaker appoints the committee and its members every year for a one year term according to the powers conferred by Article 208 of the Constitution of India read with section 32 of the States Reorganisation Act, 1956 (37 of 1956), and in pursuance of Rules 232(1) and 2(b) of the Rules of Procedure and Conduct of Business in the Punjab Legislative Assembly.

Current members
For the one year period starting May 2022, the Committee on Panchayati Raj Institutions of 16th Punjab Assembly had following members:

Chairpersons 
Since 2021, Punjab Assembly 'Committee Local Bodies and Panchayati Raj Institutions' has been split into committees, namely 'Committee on Local Bodies' and 'Committee on Panchayati Raj Institutions'.

Previous members

15th Punjab Assembly
Following were the members in the 15th Punjab Assembly (2017-2022)

References 

Committees of the Punjab Legislative Assembly